Jonathan Phillips (born 14 July 1982) is a Welsh ice hockey forward for Sheffield Steelers in the EIHL. 

Phillips has also captained the Great Britain men's national ice hockey team since 2012 and passed 100 senior caps at the 2021 IIHF World Championship. In May 2022, Phillips passed Ashley Tait for the most senior Great Britain ice hockey caps with 111, achieving the feat at the 2022 IIHF World Championship.

Career
Phillips played both football and ice hockey growing up, however by the age of 11 he fully committed to ice hockey. He caught the attention of Cardiff Devils's coach Paul Heavey while playing for Great Britain's Under 18 and Under 20 International team, and was named to his squad for 1999-00 season. He spent three seasons with the Devils in the Elite Ice Hockey League before joining the Sheffield Steelers under coach Dave Matsos. In his first season with the Steelers, he was named an alternate captain before being promoted to captain midway through the season after Shawn Maltby was injured. During his first three seasons, Phillips led the team to two Playoff Championships and League title. In September 2011, Phillips underwent surgery to repair damaged knee ligaments.

During the 2013–14 season, Phillips lost his captaincy to Stephen Goertzen but it was returned the following season. In April 2017, Phillips helped lead the Steelers to two milestones. He became the most-capped Sheffield Steelers player in history and also helped the team become the second in UK history to record ten playoff wins. After re-signing with the team, he set another milestone by becoming the first EIHL player to reach 1000 game played.

Phillips initially agreed to re-sign with the Sheffield Steelers in 2020 for a 15th year, however after the 2020-21 Elite League season was suspended indefinitely due to the coronavirus pandemic, he moved to the German Oberliga side EHF Passau Black Hawks in November 2020.

In February 2021, Phillips returned to the UK to sign for NIHL side Sheffield Steeldogs ahead of their Spring Cup series. He then rejoined the Sheffield Steelers ahead of the Elite Series in April 2021.

Personal life
Phillips met his wife Kirsty in 2000 and they married in 2012.

References

External links

Living people
Welsh ice hockey forwards
Sheffield Steelers players
1982 births
Cardiff Devils players
EHF Passau Black Hawks players
British expatriate ice hockey people
Welsh expatriate sportspeople in Germany
Expatriate ice hockey players in Germany
Sportspeople from Cardiff